Burgdorf District was a district in the canton of Bern in Switzerland with its seat at Burgdorf Castle in Burgdorf. It included 24 cities and towns in an area of :

External links 

Former districts of the canton of Bern